The Cal Palmer Memorial Building (also known as Finders Keepers) is a historic site in Windermere, Florida. It is located at 502 Main Street. On November 29, 1995, it was added to the U.S. National Register of Historic Places.

References

External links
 
 
 

National Register of Historic Places in Orange County, Florida
Windermere, Florida